Paralititan (meaning "tidal giant") was a giant titanosaurian sauropod dinosaur genus discovered in coastal deposits in the Upper Cretaceous Bahariya Formation of Egypt. It lived between 99.6 and 93.5 million years ago.

Discovery
 
Joshua Smith in 1999 in the Bahariya Oasis rediscovered the Gebel el Dist site where Richard Markgraf in 1912, 1913 and 1914 had excavated fossils for Ernst Stromer. In 2000, an American expedition was mounted to revisit the site. However, apparently Markgraf had already removed all more complete skeletons, leaving only limited remains behind. At a new site, the nearby Gebel Fagga, the expedition succeeded in locating a partial sauropod skeleton. It was identified by Lacovara as a species new to science. It was named and described by Joshua B. Smith, Matthew C. Lamanna, Kenneth J. Lacovara, Peter Dodson, Jennifer R. Smith, Jason Charles Poole, Robert Giegengack and Yousri Attia in 2001 as the type species Paralititan stromeri. The generic name  means "Stromer's tidal (Greek para + halos "near sea") titan" or "Stromer's tidal giant", in reference to the "paralic" tidal flats the animal lived on. The specific name honors Ernst Stromer von Reichenbach, a German paleontologist and geologist who first established the presence of dinosaur fossils in this area in 1911. Paralititan represents the first tetrapod reported from the Bahariya Formation since Romer's publication of 1935. 

The holotype specimen of Paralititan, CGM 81119, was found in a layer of the Bahariya Formation, dating from the Cenomanian. It consists of a partial skeleton lacking the skull. It is incomplete, apart from bone fragments containing two fused posterior sacral vertebrae, two anterior caudal vertebrae, both incomplete scapulae, two humeri and a metacarpal. The Paralititan type specimen shows evidence of having been scavenged by a carnivorous dinosaur as it was disarticulated within an oval of eight metres length with the various bones being clustered. A Carcharodontosaurus tooth was discovered in between the clusters. The holotype is part of the collection of the Cairo Geological Museum.

The large anterior dorsal vertebra 1912V11164, in 1932 by Stromer referred to an undetermined "Giant Sauropod", was in 2001 tentatively referred to Paralititan.

Description

Joshua Smith, who informally led the research team that found the dinosaur fossils, told an interviewer, "It was a truly enormous dinosaur by any reckoning."

Little of Paralititan is known, so its exact size is difficult to estimate. The complete right humerus measured 1.69 meters (5.54 ft) long which at the time of discovery was the longest known in a Cretaceous sauropod; this was surpassed in 2016 with the discovery of Notocolossus which had a 1.76 m (5 ft 9 in) humerus.

Scott Hartman estimates an animal that is massive, but still smaller than the biggest titanosaurs such as Puertasaurus, Alamosaurus, and Argentinosaurus. In 2010, Gregory S. Paul estimated its length at 20+ meters (66+ ft), and its weight at 20 tonnes (24.2 short tons). In 2012 Holtz gave a length of 32 meters (105 ft) and an estimated weight of 65.3–72.5 tonnes (72–80 short tons). In 2016, using equations that estimate body mass based on the circumference of the humerus and femur of quadrupedal animals, it was given an estimated weight of ~. In 2019 Gregory S. Paul estimated Paralititan between 30–55 tonnes (33–60.6 short tons). In 2020 Molina-Perez and Larramendi estimated the size of the animal at 27 meters (88.6 ft) and 30 tonnes (33 short tons).

From the formation another sauropod had already been known, Aegyptosaurus. Paralititan differs from Aegyptosaurus in its larger size, the latter genus weighing only fifteen tons, possibly in not having pleurocoels in its front tail vertebrae, and in possessing a relatively longer deltopectoral crest on its humerus.

Palaoenvironment

The autochthonous, scavenged skeleton was preserved in tidal flat deposits containing in the form of fossil leaves and root systems, a mangrove vegetation of seed ferns, Weichselia reticulata. The mangrove ecosystem it inhabited was situated along the southern shore of the Tethys Sea. Paralititan is the first dinosaur demonstrated to have inhabited a mangrove habitat. It lived at approximately the same time and place as giant predators Carcharodontosaurus, Spinosaurus, and the sauropod Aegyptosaurus.

References

External links 
 Paralititan in the Dino Directory

Titanosaurs
Late Cretaceous dinosaurs of Africa
Fossils of Egypt
Bahariya Formation
Fossil taxa described in 2001
Taxa named by Peter Dodson
Taxa named by Matt Lamanna
Cenomanian life